The Wisconsin Chair Company was a manufacturer of furniture and crafted wood products from the late 19th to the mid-20th century. It ran a large factory that for over half a century was the economic backbone of Port Washington, Wisconsin. The factory was destroyed twice: the first time by a huge, devastating fire in 1899 and the second time by demolition in 1959.

Formation
The company was organized in 1889 by John Bostwick, a local jeweler and son-in-law of Barnum Blake. He was one of the largest investors and eventually owned most of the shares and became president of the company. The first plant built by the Wisconsin Chair Co. became the largest employer in the area, providing work for one-sixth of the Ozaukee County work force. Its presence was most likely the chief reason that the city's Port Washington population increased from 1,659 in 1890 to more than 3,000 by 1900.

1899 fire
Surviving its first financially difficult years, the Chair company suffered its worst blow in 1899 when it was totally leveled by fire. The fire engulfed much of downtown Port Washington and engines from Sheboygan and Milwaukee were called in to help contain the blaze. The glow from the fire could be seen as far away as Whitefish Bay.

The company showed its resiliency by immediately rebuilding, and for many years remained the backbone of Port Washington's economy. The incredible success story eventually ended as sales and profits became smaller and production slowed down.

20th century

Phonographs and Records

In 1915 the Wisconsin Chair Company began producing phonograph cabinets for Edison's diamond disc machines. Soon after they incorporated the United Phonograph Corporation as a subsidiary for producing phonograph cabinets for other companies along with their own.

The UPC produced several different brands, United, Paramount, Puritan, Vista and Colonial along with incorporating the New York recording laboratories as a subsidiary for producing Paramount Records and Puritan Records to help phonograph sales. The company also made entire unbranded phonographs to be sold to local businesses; department stores, music shops, or any business wanting to sell their own house brand for which they could apply their own tag/decal. The phonograph slump of 1922-1924 caused by an over saturated market and early radio led the UPC to abandon most phonograph production, only the Paramount brand lasting into the Orthophonic era while the label lasted into the early 1930s. While production on Puritan phonographs ended between 1922-1923 the record label lasted until the late 1920s. The great depression ended all record production for the Wisconsin Chair Company.

Post-Depression

After Bostwick's death in 1935, Wisconsin Chair was run by Otto Moeser, a company trustee. The company almost failed during the Depression, surviving in part by limiting mass production and instead producing craft pieces for the luxury market.

The company had a number of specialized divisions. One, the National School Equipment Co., manufactured school chairs and desks, usually under government contracts.

The plant was a union shop under the United Brotherhood of Carpenters and Joiners.

Closure
By 1954, the company had closed its sprawling but inefficient 1900 plant, which, like the 1889 plant, was located behind and east of the N. Franklin Street business district, partially encircling the city's inner harbor.  It has now been demolished.

There is a historic plaque in the area where the plant once stood detailing the 1899 fire.

References

External links
Marker 414: Wisconsin Chair Company Fire
Official List of Wisconsin’s State Historic Markers

History of Wisconsin
1899 fires in the United States
1959 fires in the United States
Fires in Wisconsin
1899 disasters in the United States
1899 in Wisconsin
Manufacturing companies established in 1889
1954 disestablishments in Wisconsin
Industrial buildings completed in 1900
Buildings and structures demolished in 1959
1889 establishments in Wisconsin
Manufacturing companies disestablished in 1954
Demolished buildings and structures in Wisconsin
Defunct manufacturing companies based in Wisconsin